Obeakpu is a small village in Umuaka, Njaba, Imo State, Nigeria. 
The village of Amakor (now an autonomous community) is located to the east. Umele village is nearby in the west. The southern part of Obeakpu borders Ibele (now also an autonomous community). The Njaba River borders the village to the north.

References

External links
https://web.archive.org/web/20121007032112/http://www.imostate.gov.ng/state-overview/index.php?idx=imo_state_geography
https://web.archive.org/web/20160304120931/http://www.ngrguardiannews.com/index.php?option=com_content&view=article&id=78146:-okorochas-more-cities-project-a-step-in-the-right-direction&catid=3:metro&Itemid=558

Towns in Imo State